Northern Liberties Township is a defunct township that was located in Philadelphia County, Pennsylvania. The township ceased to exist and was incorporated into the City of Philadelphia after the passage of the Act of Consolidation, 1854.

History

The Liberties was a term applied by William Penn to certain tracts of land lying north and west of the city. It contained what was called "the liberty land or free lots" because the proprietaries gave to the first purchaser of ground in the colony, according to the extent of his purchase, a portion of the land within those limits free of price. The Liberties extended north of Vine Street to the mouth of Cohocksink Creek and up the same so as to go round the lands of Jurian Hartsfelder, which had already been granted away before Penn came to the colony.

There were Swedish, Dutch and English grants of land made before Penn came to be proprietor that had to be respected, so that the Liberty lands were very irregular in their boundaries, and ran by various courses along the Cohocksink, Wissinoming, Tacony, Wingohocking and other streams, and Germantown and Bristol townships, to the Schuylkill, and over the same and out to Cobbs Creek, and down the same and along the west side of the Schuylkill to a point opposite Vine Street, at the north city line, and along the same to the place of beginning. This survey was made in 1682, and the Liberties contained on the east side of the Schuylkill, ; west side, ; total, . These liberty lands on the east side of the Schuylkill became a township nearly from the time of survey, and were called the Northern Liberties, while the western Liberties, beyond the Schuylkill, became a portion of the township of Blockley.

The territory between the Delaware and Schuylkill was subsequently divided; the western part was called Penn township, and the eastern part was sometimes called the Unincorporated Northern Liberties. Whenever so spoken of, the reference was to that portion of the township which had not been taken up by the formation of districts, and by the time of consolidation the area of the township was very small, the districts of Northern Liberties, Spring Garden, Kensington, Penn, Richmond and the township of Penn and the boroughs of Aramingo and Bridesburg, having been carved out of it. In 1854 the township or Unincorporated Northern Liberties was the space of land north of Kensington, west of Richmond and Aramingo, and a portion of Frankford, south of a portion of Oxford and Bristol townships, and east of Penn township. A part of it was west of the Frankford Road, and all it was east of Germantown Road.

In the 1790 census, and for several succeeding censuses, the township was the sixth most populous urban place in the United States.

Resources
Chronology of the Political Subdivisions of the County of Philadelphia, 1683-1854
Information courtesy of ushistory.org
Incorporated District, Boroughs, and Townships in the County of Philadelphia, 1854 By Rudolph J. Walther - excerpted from the book at the ushistory.org website

References

Municipalities in Philadelphia County prior to the Act of Consolidation, 1854
History of Philadelphia